Magic was an AM radio network based in Northern England.

History

The Magic brand in UK radio originated with Magic 828, the sister station of Radio Aire in Leeds which was launched in July 1990, although no other stations were branded 'Magic' until the Emap group purchased the Metro Radio group in 1995. It can be regarded as the successor to Great North Radio which was a small network in the North East that consisted of what became Magic 1170 and Magic 1152. Preston's Red Rose Gold was the last to be converted to the Magic brand, in 2000, two or so years since the conversion of the majority of the stations. In London, Melody FM was rebranded Magic 105.4 in 1998.

The northern AM stations played Hot Adult Contemporary music. The playlists of these Magic stations predominantly consisted of hits from the 1960s and 1970s, although music from other decades was included in the mix.

The London station is more laid-back and its playlist more contemporary, playing soft adult contemporary hits from the 1980s, 1990s, and 2000s. The London station is branded with the tagline, "More music, less talk".

On 5 January 2015, the network merged with the Greatest Hits Network of Scottish AM stations to form the Bauer City 2 network. The London-based Magic became available nationally via DAB at the same time.

Directory of stations

Television channel

Following the success of the radio stations, Emap set up a corresponding Magic TV channel which is available through satellite and cable television systems and plays non-stop videos of songs established as typical of the Magic brand.

Magic albums
The Magic network released several albums since the formation of the network in the late 1990s. The albums predominantly feature music on the Magic 105.4 play list, but were also promoted on the Northern England stations too.

References

External links

Bauer Radio
Former British radio networks
Franchised radio formats